Valya Valova-Demireva (born 23 August 1961) is a Bulgarian sprinter. She competed in the women's 4 × 100 metres relay at the 1988 Summer Olympics.

References

External links
 

1961 births
Living people
Athletes (track and field) at the 1988 Summer Olympics
Bulgarian female sprinters
Olympic athletes of Bulgaria
Place of birth missing (living people)
Olympic female sprinters